The women's 53 kg weightlifting event was the second lightest women's event at the weightlifting competition, limiting competitors to a maximum of 53 kilograms of body mass. The whole competition took place on 5 October at 18:30. This event was the fourth weightlifting event to conclude. The event took place at the Jawaharlal Nehru Stadium, Delhi.

Athletes
11 lifters were selected for the games.

Results

References

See also 
2010 Commonwealth Games
Weightlifting at the 2010 Commonwealth Games

Weightlifting at the 2010 Commonwealth Games
Common